Honeybus were a 1960s pop group formed in April 1967, in London. They are best known for their 1968 UK Top 10 hit single, "I Can't Let Maggie Go", written by group member Pete Dello who also composed their previous single "(Do I Figure) In Your Life", later recorded by Dave Berry, Ian Matthews, Joe Cocker, Dave Stewart, Paul Carrack, Samantha Jones, Dana and Pierce Turner.

Career
The band's main composers were Dello and Ray Cane although other members contributed songs.  The group's supporters and critics, amongst them Kenny Everett, compared the band to Rubber Soul-era Beatles.  

Honeybus had a major hit with 1968's "I Can't Let Maggie Go", which was so popular that it earned the band a cover photo on the popular music magazine, Disc and Music Echo, for which they posed atop a red London bus. "I Can't Let Maggie Go" reached Number 8 in the UK Singles Chart, in April 1968, staying in the Top 40 for over two months.

Dello resigned in August 1968. The band recruited Jim Kelly on guitar and vocals to replace him and Cane began songwriting and performing lead vocals. This line-up scored minor successes with "She Sold Blackpool Rock" and "Girl Of Independent Means". Honeybus eventually disbanded late in 1969. Their 1970 album Story, without an active band to promote it, failed to chart. However, it is now highly collectable and sells for around £1,000 in mint condition.  It has since been re-issued on compact disc.

Dello, Hare and Kelly all went on to record solo material in the early 1970s that  was critically acclaimed but failed to achieve significant commercial success.

The Dello line-up of the band reunited in 1971 to record a new body of songs for the Bell Records label and a complete LP, Recital, for the British division of Warner Bros. Records.  A change in management at Warner Brothers meant that Recital was never issued.

"I Can't Let Maggie Go" was also a top 10 hit in Italy, with a version made by Equipe 84, entitled "Un angelo blu" ("A blue angel"). It  enjoyed an unexpected return in popularity in the 1970s, when it was used as the TV jingle commercial for "Nimble", a bread produced for slimmers.

Disbanding and aftermath

Kircher left the group in the summer of 1969 and went on tour with Engelbert Humperdinck. He was replaced by drummer Lloyd Courtney for the remainder of the sessions for their debut album. Kircher's drumming career saw him joining several bands, among them Compass with Billy Bremner, Roger Rettig and Brian Hodgson, Shanghai, John Scott Cree, Liverpool Express, Original Mirrors and Status Quo. He retired from the music industry after Quo's appearance at Live Aid.

Kelly released a solo single in 1969 on Deram entitled "Mary Mary" b/w "Rev. Richard Bailey", both written by Cane, but it failed to chart. Kelly joined the Sleaz Band in the 1970s and they released "All I Want Is You" on the Fontana label. An album was also recorded, but never released. He died on Boxing Day in 1995 after a long illness.

After a number of years out of the spotlight, Hare released new solo material in 2002.  In 2007 Hare played a few gigs with a completely new Honeybus line-up minus Dello. Surviving members of Honeybus were briefly reunited for a Dutch television programme "Single Luck" in 2003. A solo EP, "Down From Pitswood", featured two original and long-forgotten Honeybus songs, which the band had recorded for BBC Radio sessions in the late 1960s.

Lineup

The best known line-up consisted of:
Pete Dello (born Peter Blumsom, 26 May 1942, Oxford, Oxfordshire) — vocals, keyboards, guitar
Ray Cane (born Raymond John Byart, 15 September 1943, Hackney, East London) — vocals, bass, keyboards
Colin Hare (born Colin Nicholas Nicol, 4 June 1946, Combe, near Bath, Somerset) — rhythm guitar, vocals
Pete Kircher (born Peter Derek Kircher, 21 January 1945, Folkestone, Kent) — drums, vocals
Jim Kelly (born James Kelly, 19 December 1946, Dundee, Scotland – died 26 December 1995, Dundee, Scotland) — lead guitar, vocals
Lloyd Courtenay (born 20 December 1944, Wallasey, Cheshire) — drums (only recording for Story album)
Tim Fisher (born 28 October 1951, Birmingham, West Midlands) — bass (session bass player for tour)

Discography

Original albums
 1970 Story
 1973 Recital (unreleased although promo copies exist and sell for over £800, reissued on the Hanky Panky label in July 2018)

Posthumous compilation albums
 1989 Honeybus At Their Best
 1993 Old Masters, Hidden Treasures
 1997 At Their Best
 1999 The Honeybus Story
 2002 She Flies Like a Bird: The Anthology (features previously unreleased songs such as "Big Ship")

Singles
 1967 "Delighted to See You" (Dello) b/w "The Breaking Up Scene" (Cane) - Deram Records
 1967 "(Do I Figure) In Your Life" (Dello) b/w "Throw My Love Away" (Cane) - Deram
 1968 "I Can't Let Maggie Go" (Dello) b/w "Tender Are the Ashes" (Dello) - Deram 
 1968 "Girl of Independent Means" (Cane) b/w "How Long" (Kircher-Cane-Hare) - Deram  
 1969 "She Sold Blackpool Rock"  (Cane) b/w "Would You Believe" (Hare) - Deram
 1969 "La Cicogna" (Italian version of "She Sold Blackpool Rock") b/w "Chi Sei Tu"  (Italian version of "Ceilings No 2") - Decca
 1972 "Story" (Cane) b/w "The Right to Choose" (Cane) - Deram (recorded in January 1970)
 1972 "She Is the Female to My Soul"  (Dello) b/w "For Where Have You Been"  (Hare) - Bell Records
 1973 "For You Baby" (Dello) b/w "Little Lovely One" (Dello) - WEA
 1976 "I Can't Let Maggie Go" (Dello) b/w "Julie in My Heart" (Dello) - Decca Records reissue
 1982 "I Can't Let Maggie Go" (Dello) / "Tender Are the Ashes" (Dello) - Further Decca reissue

References

Other sources
Mojo Collection 3rd. Edition - Story; Honeybus - Best albums of the '70s.

External links
A tribute to Honeybus
Honeybus Recital

English pop music groups
British soft rock music groups
Beat groups
Deram Records artists